The Edi-expedition (Dutch: Edi-expeditie) was a Dutch expedition in 1890 to Edi (now Kuala Idi Cut, East Aceh) a small state on the east coast of Aceh .

Sources
1891. De Edi-expeditie van 1890. Indisch Militair Tijdschrift II. Bladzijde 285-403.

History of Aceh
Dutch conquest of Indonesia
History of Sumatra